is a multipurpose concrete gravity dam in the city of Hakusan, Ishikawa Prefecture, Japan, completed in 1967.

Municipalities along the Tedori River had been plagued by water shortages for decades, with farmers upstream in conflict with farmers further downstream over water rights.  A large-scale modern irrigation project was begun by the Japanese government in 1903. The region suffered from major flooding in 1943. As part of ongoing water management efforts, the Dainichigawa Dam was constructed on a branch of the Tedori River from 1952 by Kajima Corporation.

References 

Dams in Ishikawa Prefecture
Dams completed in 1967
Gravity dams